František Hoholko (1 May 1947 – 9 February 2005) was a former Slovak football winger or striker and later coach. During his playing career he made 228 appearances and scored 44 goals at the Czechoslovak First League. Hoholko was the top VSS scorer in the 1970–71 season, scoring 13 goals.

On 7 October 1970, Hoholko played his only match for the Czechoslovakia national football team against Finland (1–1, Letná Stadium) at the UEFA Euro 1972 qualifying.

He acted as head coach at the Slovak Second League team FK Čaňa before his death in 2005.

References

External links
František Hoholko at The Football Association of the Czech Republic

1947 births
2005 deaths
Slovak footballers
Czechoslovak footballers
Czechoslovakia international footballers
FC VSS Košice players
Slovak football managers
Association football midfielders
Association football forwards